Nair Bello Sousa Francisco  (April 28, 1931 – April 17, 2007) was a Brazilian actress and comedian. She was born in São Paulo, and died there aged 75.

Telenovelas 
2005 - Bang Bang - as Dona Zorra (Leona Lake; special participation)
2003 - Kubanacan - as Dolores
2002 - O Quinto dos Infernos - as Giovanna (Marquesa de Pesto)
2000 - Uga-Uga - as Pierina
1998 - Torre de Babel - as Carlotinha Bimbatti
1998 - Era Uma Vez - as Dona Santa
1996 - Vira-lata - as Antonieta
1995 - Malhação - as Olga Prata
1994 - A Viagem - as Cininha
1993 - O Mapa da Mina - as Zilda Machado
1992 - Perigosas Peruas - as Dona Gema
1983 - Maçã do Amor (Rede Bandeirantes) - as Filomena
1982 - Dona Santa (Rede Bandeirantes) - as Dona Santa
1980 - Olhai os Lírios do Campo - as Micaela
1978 - João Brasileiro, o Bom Baiano (Rede Tupi) - as Pina

External links

1931 births
2007 deaths
Brazilian people of Italian descent
Brazilian telenovela actresses
Brazilian film actresses